Blondi (1941 – 29 April 1945) was Adolf Hitler's German Shepherd, a gift as a puppy from Martin Bormann in 1941. Hitler kept Blondi even after his move into the Führerbunker located underneath the garden of the Reich Chancellery on 16 January 1945.

Hitler was very fond of Blondi, keeping her by his side and allowing her to sleep in his bed whilst in the bunker. According to Hitler's secretary Traudl Junge, this affection was not shared by Eva Braun, Hitler's companion, who preferred her two Scottish Terrier dogs named Negus and Stasi.

Blondi played a role in Nazi propaganda by portraying Hitler as an animal lover. Dogs like Blondi were coveted as "", being close to the wolf, and became very fashionable during the Nazi era. On 29 April 1945, one day before his death, Hitler expressed doubts about the cyanide capsules he had received through Heinrich Himmler's SS. To verify the capsules' potency, Hitler ordered Dr. Werner Haase to test one on Blondi, who died as a result.

Blondi's puppies
In March or in early April (likely 4 April) 1945, she had a litter of five puppies with Gerdy Troost's German Shepherd, Harras. Adolf Hitler named one of the puppies "Wulf", his favorite nickname and the meaning of his own first name, Adolf ("noble wolf"), and he began to train her. One of Blondi's puppies was reserved for Eva Braun's sister Gretl. Eva sent Gretl a letter containing a photo of Blondi and three of her puppies, Gretl's being indicated with an arrow.

Other dogs

During his military service in World War I, Hitler rescued a stray white Fox Terrier named Fuchsl. Hitler had great affection for the dog, and when he was not on duty at the front, he would spend much of his free time playing with the dog in the barracks. Hitler was profoundly distraught when he lost him in August 1917.

He had been given a German Shepherd before named "Prinz" in 1921, during his years of poverty, but he had been forced to lodge the dog elsewhere. However, he managed to escape and return to him. Hitler, who adored the loyalty and obedience of the dog, thereafter developed a great liking for the breed.

He also owned a German Shepherd called "Muckl". Before Blondi, Hitler had two German Shepherd dogs, a mother [born 1926] and daughter [born ca. 1930] – both named Blonda. In some photos taken during the 1930s the younger Blonda is incorrectly labeled as Blondi (in most cases photograph inscriptions were written later).

In May 1942, Hitler bought another young German Shepherd "from a minor official in the post office in Ingolstadt" to keep Blondi company. He called her Bella. According to Traudl Junge, Eva Braun was very fond of her two Scottish Terrier dogs named Negus and Stasi. She usually kept them away from Blondi.

Death of Blondi and other dogs
During the course of 29 April 1945, Hitler learned of the death of his ally Benito Mussolini at the hands of Italian partisans on 28 April. This, along with the fact the Soviet Red Army was closing in on his location, strengthened Hitler in his resolve not to allow himself or his wife to be captured. That afternoon, Hitler expressed doubts about the cyanide capsules he had received through Heinrich Himmler's SS. (By this point, Hitler regarded Himmler as a traitor.) To verify the capsules' contents, Hitler—who already intended to have Blondi killed so that she did not fall into the hands of the Soviets—ordered Dr. Werner Haase to test one on Blondi, and the dog died as a result. Hitler became completely inconsolable.

According to a report commissioned by Joseph Stalin and based on eyewitness accounts, Hitler's dog-handler, Feldwebel Fritz Tornow, took Blondi's pups and shot them in the garden of the bunker complex on 30 April 1945, after Hitler and Eva Braun had committed suicide that same day. He also killed Eva Braun's two dogs, Gerda Christian's dogs, and his own dachshund. Tornow was later captured by  the Allies. Erna Flegel, who met Hitler and worked at the emergency casualty-station in the Reich Chancellery, stated in 2005 that Blondi's death had affected the people in the bunker more than Eva Braun's suicide. After the battle in Berlin ended (2 May 1945), the remains of Hitler, Braun, and two dogs (thought to be Blondi and her offspring Wulf) were discovered in a shell crater by a unit of SMERSH, the Soviet counter-intelligence agency. The dog thought to be Blondi was exhumed and photographed by the Soviets.

See also
 List of individual dogs

Notes

References

1941 animal births
1945 animal deaths
Individual dogs in politics
German shepherds
Adolf Hitler
Individual animals in Germany
History of animal testing